Winners for the 2010 African-American Film Critics Association.

Best Picture
Winner: The Social Network

Top 10 Pictures:
The Social Network
The King's Speech
Inception
Black Swan
Night Catches Us
The Fighter
Frankie & Alice
Blood Done Sign My Name
Get Low
For Colored Girls

Other categories

References

2010 film awards
African-American Film Critics Association Awards